The 30th International Istanbul Film Festival was a film festival held in Istanbul, Turkey, which ran from April 2 to 17, 2011. 232 films were screened in 21 categories at Atlas, Beyoğlu, Fitaş, Pera Museum Cinema, Nişantaşı CityLife, and Kadıköy Rexx.

This edition of the International Istanbul Film Festival was organized by the Istanbul Foundation for Culture and Arts (İKSV), accredited by FIAPF, and opened with a gala ceremony at the Lütfi Kırdar Congress and Exhibition Hall on April 1, 2010 at which a host of celebrities, including Saadet Işıl Aksoy, Mert Fırat, İzzet Günay, Mehmet Günsür, Semih Kaplanoğlu, Özgü Namal, Türkan Şoray, Hale Soygazi, Yeşim Ustaoğlu, and Serra Yılmaz discussed their memories of the festival accompanied by footage from the festival's previous editions, including archive street interviews with festival-goers, and honorary awards were bestowed upon their recipients, including Isabelle Huppert whose Copacabana was shown as the opening film of the festival.

British rock band Tindersticks started their Claire Denis Film Scores 1995-2010 international tour on April 11 with a live performance  of scores the band made for French auteur Claire Denis. The festival also included a preview of the cinematic content of the 12th Istanbul Biennial which was shown in a special selection titled "Untitled (Film)", organised in a special collaboration.

A special anniversary book titled 30: 30 Years from 20 Directors in which 20 directors discuss the role of the festival in their personal histories was published and an exhibition of photos of the contributors by photographer Muhsin Akgün, taken in different spots at the Emek, Atlas, Beyoğlu, Sinepop, and Yeşilçam theaters in Beyoğlu, was exhibited in the Atlas Arcade, while the 30 Years in Film blog, launched in February, allowed festival audiences to share their own memories of the festival.

A special gala was held at the 61st Berlin International Film Festival on February 11, 2011, to celebrate this anniversary edition of the festival and to promote Turkish cinema.

Awards

Honorary Cinema Awards
 Turkish actors Metin Akpınar and Zeki Alasya
 Hungarian director Belá Tarr
 French actress Isabelle Huppert
 Turkish director Yusuf Kurçenli
 Turkish director of photography Ertunç Şenkay

See also 
 2011 in film
 Turkish films of 2011

External links
  for the festival

References

2011 film festivals
Istanbul International Film Festival
Turkish film awards
2011 in Istanbul